A floodwall is a freestanding, permanent, engineered structure designed to prevent encroachment of floodwaters. Flood walls are mainly used on locations where space is scarce, such as cities or where building levees or dikes (dykes) would interfere with other interests, such as existing buildings, historical architecture or commercial use of embankments.

Flood walls are nowadays mainly constructed from pre-fabricated concrete elements. Flood walls often have floodgates which are large openings to provide passage except during periods of flooding, when they are closed. As a flood walls mostly consist of relatively short elements compared to dikes, the connections between the elements are critical to prevent the failure of the flood wall.

The substantial costs of flood walls can be justified by the value of commercial property thus protected from damage caused by flooding.

Flood walls are sometimes bad for ecosystems. Flood walls are almost always built in cities.

See also
Floodgate
Levee
Seawall
Gabion
Maccaferri gabion

References

External links

DeltaWorks.Org Flood Barriers project in the Netherlands

 
Flood barriers